Vranje is a city in Southern Serbia and the administrative center of the Pčinja District. The municipality of Vranje has a population of 83,524 and its urban area has 60,485 inhabitants.

Vranje is the economical, political and cultural centre of the Pčinja District in Southern Serbia. It is the first city from the Balkans to be declared UNESCO city of Music. It is located on the Pan-European Corridor X, close to the borders with North Macedonia and Bulgaria. The Serbian Orthodox Eparchy of Vranje is seated in the city, as is the 4th Land Force Brigade of the Serbian Army.

Etymology
The toponym Vranje is first attested in an 11th-century Byzantine text. The town's name is believed to be derived from vran, a word of Slavic origin meaning swarthy or dark, or the archaic Slavic given name Vran, which itself is derived from the same word.

History
The Romans conquered the region in the 2nd or 1st centuries BC. Vranje was part of Moesia Superior and Dardania during Roman rule. The Roman fortresses in the Vranje region were abandoned during the Hun attacks in 539–544 AD; these include the localities of Kale at Vranjska Banja, Gradište in Korbevac and Gradište in Prvonek.

During the Middle Ages, in the 9th-11th centuries, the territory of modern-day Vranje was a part of Bulgaria. 

The first written mention of Vranje comes from Byzantine chronicle Alexiad by Anna Comnena (1083–1153), in which it is mentioned how Serbian ruler Vukan in 1093, as part of his conquests, reached Vranje and conquered it, however only shortly, as he was forced to retreat from the powerful Byzantines. The city name stems from the Old Serbian word vran ("black"). The second mention is from 1193, when Vranje was temporarily taken by Serbian Grand Prince Stefan Nemanja from the Byzantines. Vranje definitely entered the Serbian state in 1207 when it was conquered by Grand Prince Stefan Nemanjić.

Some time before 1306, tepčija Kuzma was given the governorship of Vranje (a župa, "county", including the town and neighbouring villages), serving King Stefan Milutin. At the same time, kaznac Miroslav held the surroundings of Vranje. Next, kaznac Baldovin (fl. 1325–45) received the province around Vranje, serving King Stefan Dečanski. Next, župan Maljušat, Baldovin's son, held the župa of Vranje. By the time of the proclamation of the Serbian Empire, holders with the title kefalija are present in Vranje, among other cities. During the fall of the Serbian Empire, Vranje was part of Uglješa Vlatković's possessions, which also included Preševo and Kumanovo. Uglješa became a vassal of Serbian Despot Stefan Lazarević after the Battle of Tripolje (1403); Vranje became part of Serbian Despotate.
 
The medieval župa was a small landscape unit, whose territory expanded with creation of new settlements and independence of hamlets and neighbourhoods from župa villages and shepherd cottages. Good mercantile relations with developing mine city Novo Brdo led to creation of numerous settlements. In 1455, Vranje was conquered by the Ottoman Empire, amid the fall of the medieval Serbian state. It was organized as the seat of a kaza (county), named Vranje, after the city and the medieval župa.  In the mid-19th century, Austrian diplomat Johann Georg von Hahn stated that the population of Vranje kaza was six-sevenths Bulgarian and one-seventh Albanian, while the city population consisted of 1,000 Christian-Bulgarian families, 600 Albanian-Turkish and 50 Romani. The urban Muslim population of Vranje consisted of Albanians and Turks, of which a part were themselves of Albanian origin.

Vranje was part of the Ottoman Empire until 1878, when the town was captured by the Serbian army commanded by Jovan Belimarković. During the Serbian–Ottoman War (1876–1878) most of the Muslim population of Vranje fled to the Ottoman vilayet of Kosovo while a smaller number left after the conflict.  The city entered the Principality of Serbia, with little more than 8,000 inhabitants at that time. The only Muslim population permitted to remain after the war in the town were Serbian speaking Muslim Romani of whom in 1910 numbered 6,089 in Vranje. Up until the end of the Balkan Wars Vranje had a special position and role, as the transmissive station of Serbian state political and cultural influence on Macedonia.

In the early 20th century, Vranje had around 12,000 inhabitants. As a border town of the Kingdom of Serbia, it was used as the starting point for Serbian guerrilla (Chetniks) who crossed into Ottoman territory and fought in Kosovo and Macedonia. In World War I, the main headquarters of the Serbian army was in the town. King Peter I Karađorđević, Prime Minister Nikola Pašić and the chief of staff General Radomir Putnik stayed in Vranje. Vranje was occupied by the Kingdom of Bulgaria on 16–17 October 1915, after which war crimes and Bulgarisation was committed on the city and wider region.
 
After the war, Vranje was part of the Kingdom of Serbs, Croats and Slovenes in one of the 33 oblasts; in 1929, it became part of the Vardar Banovina. During World War II, Nazi German troops entered the town on 9 April 1941 and transferred it to Bulgarian administration on 22 April 1941. During Bulgarian occupation, 400 Serbs were shot and around 4,000 interned. Vranje was liberated by the Yugoslav Partisans on 7 September 1944.

During Socialist Yugoslavia, Vranje was organized into the Pčinja District. In the 1960s and 1970s it was industrialized. During the 1990s, the economy of Vranje was heavily affected by the sanctions against Yugoslavia and the 1999 NATO bombing of Yugoslavia.

Geography
Vranje is situated in the northwestern part of the Vranje basin, on the left waterside of the South Morava.

Vranje is at base of the mountains Pljačkovica, Krstilovice and Pržar. The Vranje river and the city are divided by the main road and railway line, which leads to the north Leskovac (70 km), Niš and Belgrade, and, to the south Kumanovo, Skopje and Thessalonica.

Vranje is the economical, political, and cultural centre of the Pčinja District in South Serbia. The Pčinja District also includes the municipalities of Bosilegrad, Bujanovac, Vladičin Han, Preševo, Surdulica, and Trgovište. It is located on the Pan-European Corridor X.

Climate

Demographics

The city population has been expanded by Yugoslav-era settlers and urbanization from its surroundings. Serb refugees of the Yugoslav Wars (1991–95) and the Kosovo War (1998–99), especially during and following the 1999 NATO bombing of Yugoslavia, as well as emigrants from Kosovo in the aftermath of the latter conflict have further increased the population.

According to the 2011 census results, there are 83,524 inhabitants in the city of Vranje.

Ethnic groups
The ethnic composition of the city administrative area (2011 census):

Municipalities and settlements

The city of Vranje consists of two city municipalities: Vranje and Vranjska Banja. Their municipal areas include the following settlements:

Municipality of Vranje

 Aleksandrovac
 Barbarušince
 Barelić
 Beli Breg
 Bojin Del
 Bresnica
 Buljesovce
 Buštranje
 Crni Lug
 Čestelin
 Ćukovac
 Ćurkovica
 Davidovac
 Dobrejance
 Donja Otulja
 Donje Punoševce
 Donje Trebešinje
 Donje Žapsko
 Donji Neradovac
 Dragobužde
 Drenovac
 Dubnica
 Dulan
 Dupeljevo
 Golemo Selo
 Gornja Otulja
 Gornje Punoševce
 Gornje Trebešinje
 Gornje Žapsko
 Gornji Neradovac
 Gradnja
 Gumerište
 Katun
 Klašnjice
 Koćura
 Kopanjane
 Kruševa Glava
 Krševica
 Kupinince
 Lalince
 Lepčince
 Lukovo
 Margance
 Mečkovac
 Mijakovce
 Mijovce
 Milanovo
 Milivojce
 Moštanica
 Nastavce
 Nova Brezovica
 Oblička Sena
 Ostra Glava
 Pavlovac
 Pljačkovica
 Preobraženje
 Ranutovac
 Rataje
 Ribnice
 Ristovac
 Roždace
 Rusce (Vranje)
 Sikirje
 Smiljević
 Soderce
 Srednji Del
 Stance
 Stara Brezovica
 Strešak
 Stropsko
 Struganica
 Studena
 Surdul
 Suvi Dol
 Tesovište
 Tibužde
 Trstena
 Tumba
 Urmanica
 Uševce
 Viševce
 Vlase (Vranje)
 Vranje
 Vrtogoš
 Zlatokop

Municipality of Vranjska Banja

 Babina Poljana
 Bujkovac
 Crni Vrh
 Duga Luka
 Izumno
 Klisurica
 Korbevac
 Korbul
 Kriva Feja
 Kumarevo (Vranje)
 Leva Reka
 Lipovac
 Nesvrta
 Panevlje
 Prvonek
 Prevalac
 Sebevranje
 Slivnica
 Stari Glog
 Toplac
 Vranjska Banja

Society and culture

Culture
 
 
Vranje was an important Ottoman trading site. The White Bridge is a symbol of the city and is called "most ljubavi" (lovers' bridge) after the tale of the forbidden love between the Muslim girl Ajša and Christian Stojan that resulted in the father killing the couple. After that, he built the bridge where he had killed her and had the story inscribed in Ottoman Arabic. The 11th-century Markovo Kale fortress is in the north of the city. The city has traditional Balkan and Ottoman architecture.

The well-known theater play Koštana by Bora Stanković is set in Vranje.

Vranje is famous for its popular old music. The best known music is from the theater piece with music, Koštana, by Bora Stanković. This original music style has been renewed recently by taking different, specific, and more oriental form, with the contribution of rich brass instruments. It is played particularly by the Vranje Romani people.

Vranje is the seat of Pčinja District and, as such, is a major center for cultural events in the district. Most notable annual events are Borina nedelja, Stari dani, Dani karanfila (in Vranjska Banja), etc.

Vranje lies close to Besna Kobila mountain and Vranjska Banja, locations with high potential that are underdeveloped. Other locations in and around Vranje with some tourist potential include Prohor Pčinjski monastery, Kale-Krševica, Markovo kale, Pržar, birth-house museum of Bora Stankovic.

Largest hotels are Hotel Vranje, near the center and Hotel Pržar overlooking the city and the valley. The city has traditional Serbian cuisine as well as international cuisine restaurants and many cafes and bars.

Culture institutions
 
 National Museum (in former Pasha's residence, built in 1765)
 Youth Cultural Centre
 National Library
 Centre for Talents
 Theater "Bora Stanković"
 Tourist organization of Vranje

Sport
The city has one top-flight association football team, Dinamo Vranje.

Economy

Vranje is located in southern Serbia, on Corridor X near the border with North Macedonia and Bulgaria. Vranje has a long tradition of industrial production, trade, and tourism and is rich in natural resources, such as forests and geothermal resources.

Until the second half of the 20th century Vranje was a craftsman town. The crafts included weaving, water-milling, and carriages craft. With the beginning of industrialization in the 1960s, many of these crafts disappeared. In those years, many factories were opened, such as the Tobacco Industry of Vranje, Simpo, Koštana (shoe factory), Yumco (cotton plant), Alfa Plam (technical goods), SZP Zavarivač Vranje and others.

The most common industries in the city of Vranje are timber industry, clothing, footwear and furniture, food and beverages, agricultural, textile industry, chemical industry, construction industry, machinery and equipment, and business services. There are more than 2,500 small- and medium-size companies. To potential investors there are industrial sites, with plan documents and furnished infrastructure. Among the companies with business locations in the city are British American Tobacco, Simpo, Sanch, Mladenovic D.O.O, Kenda Farben, Danny style, OMV and Hellenic Petroleum.

As of September 2017, Vranje has one of 14 free economic zones established in Serbia.

Historical statistics
As of 1961, there were 1,525 employees; in 1971, there were 4,374 employees; and in 1998, there were 32,758 employees. Following the breakup of Yugoslavia, and due to sanctions imposed on FR Yugoslavia during the rule of Slobodan Milošević, the number of employees began to drop; factories which employed a large number of people closed, among whom are Yumco and Koštana. As of 2010, there were only 18,958 employed inhabitants and 7,559 unemployed. As of 2010, the city of Vranje has 59,278 available workers. In 2010, the City Council passed the "Strategy of sustainable development of the city of Vranje from 2010 to 2019," for the achievement of objectives through a transparent and responsible business partnership with industry and the public.

As of 2020, a total of 24,509 people were employed. A total of 5,921 people (19.46%) were unemployed.

Economic preview
The following table gives a preview of total number of registered people employed in legal entities per their core activity (as of 2020):

Notable people

Borisav Stanković (1876–1927), Serbian writer
Justin Popović (1894–1979), theologian and philosopher

International relations

Twin towns – sister cities
The city of Vranje is twinned with:
 Nowy Sącz, Poland, since 2002
 Kavala, Greece, since 2009
 Leposavić, Kosovo

See also
 List of cities in Serbia

Notes

References

Sources

Further reading

External links

 
 Library of Vranje
 Museum of Vranje
 Tourist organization of Vranje 

 
Populated places in Pčinja District
Municipalities and cities of Southern and Eastern Serbia